is a railway station in the city of Nakano, Nagano, Japan, operated by the private railway operating company Nagano Electric Railway.

Lines
Nakano-Matsukawa Station is a station on the Nagano Electric Railway Nagano Line and is 27.0 kilometers from the terminus of the line at Nagano Station.

Station layout
The station consists of one ground-level side platform serving a single bi-directional track. The station is unattended.

Adjacent stations

History
The station opened on 28 April 1927.

Passenger statistics
In fiscal 2015, the station was used by an average of 68 passengers daily (boarding passengers only).

Surrounding area
Nakano Elementary School
Matsukawa Post Office

See also
 List of railway stations in Japan

References

External links

 

Railway stations in Japan opened in 1927
Railway stations in Nagano Prefecture
Nagano Electric Railway
Nakano, Nagano